Ademir Vieira (born 18 October 1951), known as just Ademir is a retired Brazilian footballer.

Career statistics

Club

Notes

References

1951 births
Living people
Brazilian footballers
Brazilian expatriate footballers
Association football midfielders
Esporte Clube Santo André players
S.C. Olhanense players
Toronto Blizzard (1971–1984) players
FC Porto players
RC Celta de Vigo players
Louletano D.C. players
Imortal D.C. players
Galícia Esporte Clube players
F.C. Arouca players
Liga Portugal 2 players
Brazilian expatriate sportspeople in Portugal
Expatriate footballers in Portugal
Brazilian expatriate sportspeople in Canada
Expatriate soccer players in Canada
Brazilian expatriate sportspeople in Spain
Expatriate footballers in Spain
Footballers from São Paulo